Physicians and surgeons play an important role in the provision of health care in Canada. They are responsible for the promotion, maintenance, and restoration of health through the study, diagnosis, prognosis, and treatment of disease, injury, and other physical and mental impairments. As Canadian medical schools solely offer the Doctor of Medicine (M.D.) or Doctor of Medicine and Master of Surgery (M.D., C.M.) degrees, these represent the degrees held by the vast majority of physicians and surgeons in Canada, though some have a Doctor of Osteopathic Medicine (D.O.) from the United States or Bachelor of Medicine, Bachelor of Surgery (M.B., B.S.) from Europe.

In order to practice in a Canadian province or territory, physicians and surgeons must obtain certification from either the College of Family Physicians of Canada (CFPC) or the Royal College of Physicians and Surgeons of Canada (RCPSC), as well as become members of the provincial or territorial medical professional regulatory authority.

History

Hospitals were initially places which cared for the poor as those with higher socioeconomic status were cared for at home. In Quebec during the 18th century, a series of charitable institutions, many set up by Catholic religious orders, provided such care.

The first medical schools were established in Lower Canada in the 1820s. These included the Montreal Medical Institution, which is the McGill University Faculty of Medicine today. In the mid-1870s, Sir William Osler changed the face of medical school instruction with the introduction of the hands-on approach. The College of Physicians and Surgeons of Upper Canada was established in 1839, and in 1869, it was permanently incorporated. In 1834, William Kelly, a surgeon with the Royal Navy, introduced the idea of preventing the spread of disease via sanitation measures following epidemics of cholera. In 1892, Dr. William Osler wrote the landmark text The Principles and Practice of Medicine, which dominated medical instruction in the West for the following half century. Around this time, a movement began that called for the improved healthcare for the poor, focusing mainly on sanitation and hygiene. This period saw important advances including the provision of safe drinking water to most of the population, public baths and beaches, and municipal garbage services to remove waste from the city. During this period, medical care was severely lacking for the poor and minorities such as First Nations.

Women in medicine in Canada

In the late nineteenth and early twentieth centuries, women made inroads into various professions including teaching, journalism, social work, and public health. In 1871, female physicians Emily Howard Stowe and Jennie Kidd Trout won the right for women to be admitted to medical schools and were granted licences from the College of Physicians and Surgeons of Ontario. In 1883, Emily Stowe led the creation of the Ontario Medical College for Women, affiliated with the University of Toronto. These advances included the establishment of a Women's Medical College in Toronto, as well as in Kingston, Ontario. Stowe's daughter, Augusta Stowe-Gullen, became the first woman to graduate from a Canadian medical school.

Canadian healthcare system

Healthcare in Canada is delivered through thirteen provincial and territorial systems of publicly funded health care, informally called Medicare. It is guided by the provisions of the Canada Health Act of 1984. The government ensures the quality of care through federal standards. The government does not participate in day-to-day care or collect any information about an individual's health, which remains confidential as per the doctor-patient relationship. Canada's provincially based Medicare systems are cost-effective because of their administrative simplicity. In each province, each doctor handles the insurance claim against the provincial insurer. There is no need for the person who accesses healthcare to be involved in billing and reclaim. Private health expenditure accounts for about 30% of health care financing. The Canada Health Act does not cover prescription drugs, home care or long-term care, or dental care, which implies that most Canadians rely on private insurance from their employers or the government to pay for the costs associated with these services. Provinces provide partial coverage for children, those living in poverty, and seniors. Programs vary by province.

Canada has a ratio of practising physicians to population that is below the OECD average.

In 2006, it was reported that family physicians in Canada earned an average of $202,000 a year. Alberta had the highest average salary of around $230,000, while Quebec had the lowest average annual salary at $165,000, arguably creating inter-provincial competition for doctors and contributing to local shortages at the time. In 2018, to draw attention to the work of nurses and the declining level of service provided to patients, more than 700 physicians, residents, and medical students in Quebec signed an online petition asking for their pay raises to be canceled.

In 1991, the Ontario Medical Association agreed to become a province-wide closed shop, making the OMA union a monopoly. Critics argue that this measure has restricted the supply of doctors to guarantee its members' incomes. In 2008, the Ontario Medical Association and the Ontario government agreed to a four-year contract with a 12.25% doctors' pay raise, which was expected to cost Ontarians an extra $1 billion. Ontario's then-premier Dalton McGuinty said, "One of the things that we've got to do, of course, is ensure that we're competitive ... to attract and keep doctors here in Ontario...".

In December 2008, the Society of Obstetricians and Gynaecologists of Canada reported a critical shortage of obstetricians and gynecologists. The report stated that 1,370 obstetricians were practising in Canada and that number is expected to fall by at least one-third within five years. The society is asking the government to increase the number of residency positions obstetrics and gynecology by 30 percent a year for three years and also recommended rotating placements of doctors into smaller communities to encourage them to take up residence there.

Each province regulates its medical profession through a self-governing regulatory body, which is responsible for licensing physicians, setting practice standards, and investigating and disciplining its members.

The national doctors association is called the Canadian Medical Association; it describes its mission as "To serve and unite the physicians of Canada and be the national advocate, in partnership with the people of Canada, for the highest standards of health and health care." Because healthcare is deemed to be under provincial/territorial jurisdiction, negotiations on behalf of physicians are conducted by provincial associations such as the Ontario Medical Association. The views of Canadian doctors have been mixed, particularly in their support for allowing parallel private financing. The history of Canadian physicians in the development of Medicare has been described by David Naylor. Since the passage of the 1984 Canada Health Act, the CMA itself has been a strong advocate of maintaining a strong publicly funded system, including lobbying the federal government to increase funding, and being a founding member of (and active participant in) the Health Action Lobby (HEAL).

However, internal disputes may occur. In particular, some provincial medical associations have argued for permitting a larger private role. To some extent, this has been a reaction to strong cost control; CIHI estimates that 99% of physician expenditures in Canada come from public sector sources, and physicians—particularly those providing elective procedures who have been squeezed for operating room time—have accordingly looked for alternative revenue sources. One indication came in August 2007 when the CMA elected as president Dr. Brian Day of British Columbia, who owns the largest private hospital in Canada and vocally supports increasing private healthcare in Canada. The CMA presidency rotates among the provinces, with the provincial association electing a candidate who is customarily ratified by the CMA general meeting. Day's selection was sufficiently controversial that he was challenged—albeit unsuccessfully—by another physician member.

Education and training

There are multiple components to the education of a physician or surgeon in Canada, and the process varies slightly between provinces.

Medical school

Generally, in order to be admitted into a Canadian medical school, one must have completed at least an undergraduate degree. However, not all medical schools in Canada require a bachelor's degree for entry. For example, Quebec's medical schools accept applicants after a two-year CEGEP diploma, which is the equivalent of other provinces' grade 12 plus the first year of university. Most faculties of medicine in Western Canada require at least 2 years, and most faculties in Ontario require at least 3 years of university study before application can be made to medical school. The University of Manitoba requires applicants to complete a prior degree before admission. The Association of Faculties of Medicine of Canada (AFMC) publishes a detailed guide to admission requirements of Canadian faculties of medicine on a yearly basis.

Admission offers are made by individual medical schools, generally on the basis of a personal statement, autobiographical sketch, undergraduate record (GPA), scores on the Medical College Admission Test (MCAT), and interviews. Medical schools in Quebec (Francophones and Anglophone alike), the University of Ottawa (a bilingual school), and the Northern Ontario School of Medicine (a school which promotes francophone culture),  do not require the MCAT, as the MCAT has no French equivalent. Some schools, such as the University of Toronto and Queen's University, use the MCAT score as a cut-off, where sub-standard scores compromise eligibility. Other schools, such as the University of Western Ontario, give increasing preference to higher performance. McMaster University strictly utilizes the Critical Analysis and Reasoning section of the MCAT to determine interview eligibility and admission rank.

There are currently seventeen medical schools in Canada. They offer a three- to five-year Doctor of Medicine (M.D.) or Doctor of Medicine and Master of Surgery (M.D., C.M.) degree. The only Canadian medical school to offer the M.D., C.M. degree is McGill University's Faculty of Medicine. Although presently most students enter medicine having previously earned another degree, the M.D. is technically considered an undergraduate degree in Canada.

The annual success rate for Canadian citizens applying for admission to Canadian medical schools is normally below 10%. Just over 2,500 positions were available in first-year classes in 2006-2007 across all seventeen Canadian faculties of medicine.  The average cost of tuition in 2006-2007 was $12,728 for medical schools outside of Quebec; in Quebec (for Quebecers only), average tuition was $2,943.  The level of debt among Canadian medical students upon graduation has received attention in the medical media.

Medical school in Canada is generally a four-year program at most universities. Notable exceptions include McMaster University and the University of Calgary, where programs run for three years, without interruption for the summer. McGill University and Université de Montréal in the province of Quebec both offer a five-year program that includes a medical preparatory year to entering CEGEP graduates. While Université Laval in Quebec City offers a four- to five-year program to all entering students (both CEGEP graduates and university-level students), Université de Sherbrooke offers a formal four-year M.D. program to all admitted students.

The first half of the medical curriculum is dedicated mostly to teaching the fundamentals of, or basic subjects relevant to, medicine, such as anatomy, histology, physiology, pharmacology, genetics, microbiology, medical ethics, health law, and epidemiology, among many others. This instruction can be organized by discipline or by organ system. Teaching methods can include traditional lectures, problem-based learning, laboratory sessions, simulated patient sessions, and limited clinical experiences. The remainder of medical school is spent in clerkship. Clinical clerks participate in the day-to-day management of patients.  They are supervised and taught during this clinical experience by residents and fully licensed staff physicians. Typical rotations include internal medicine, family medicine, psychiatry, surgery, emergency medicine, obstetrics and gynecology, and pediatrics. Elective rotations are often available for students to explore specialties of interest for upcoming residency training.

Some medical schools offer joint degree programs in which a limited number of interested medical students may simultaneously enroll in Master of Science (MSc) or Doctor of Philosophy (PhD) programs in related fields. Often this research training is undertaken during elective time and between the basic science and clinical clerkship halves of the curriculum. For example, while Université de Sherbrooke offers a M.D./MSc program, McGill University offers a M.D./PhD for medical students holding an undergraduate degree in a relevant field. Some universities also offer joint programs in business administration, including McGill University with its joint program leading to the degrees of Doctor of Medicine and Master of Business Administration (M.D./MBA).

Residency
Residency training is also known as postgraduate medical education.

Graduating medical students in Canada must apply to a residency position via the Canadian Residency Matching Service (CaRMS). Some of the available programs include family medicine, internal medicine, emergency medicine, anesthesia, pediatrics, psychiatry, obstetrics and gynecology, radiology, general surgery, orthopedic surgery, neurosurgery, and urology.

The match for entry level (R-1) postgraduate positions is CaRMS' largest match. It encompasses all 17 Canadian medical schools and is offered in two iterations each year. The first iteration includes all graduating students and prior year graduates from Canada and the US who meet the basic eligibility criteria and have no prior postgraduate training in Canada or the US. It is also open to graduates from international medical schools (IMGs) who meet the basic criteria and have no prior postgraduate training in Canada or the US. Some of the positions are exclusive to IMGs who meet the basic criteria, with Canadian graduates being excluded from applying to these positions.

The second iteration includes positions left over from the first iteration, which are often in less desirable locations, programs, and fields. Applicants not matched in the first iteration can apply to these positions. Foreign medical graduates who did not match to the positions exclusively offered to them in the first iteration, as well as any US or Canadian physician with prior post-graduate training obtained in either the first or second iterations of their respective matches can also apply to these remaining training positions.

Residents’ salaries are negotiated by the residency associations and are determined by two things: the postgraduate year and the province they are working in. A resident physician in the second year of a training program (PGY-2) in Ontario would receive the same salary as every other resident physician in that province.

Fellowship
Fellowship is an optional phase of training available to physicians having completed at least part of their residency training.

Although fellowships are much more common among specialist physicians and surgeons, some are available for physicians having completed training in family medicine.

Most fellowship training positions are also allocated using the CaRMS algorithm via the Family Medicine/Emergency Medicine Match, the Medicine Subspecialty Match, and the Pediatric Subspecialty Match. The Family Medicine/Emergency Medicine match is for applicants who are completing or have completed postgraduate training in family medicine in Canada and want to pursue further emergency medicine training. The Medicine Subspecialty Match is for residents currently in an internal medicine residency training program who are looking to apply for subspecialty training. Fields of training may include cardiology, gastroenterology, general internal medicine, nephrology, and respirology, amongst others. The Pediatric Subspecialty Match is for residents currently in a pediatric residency training program who are looking to apply for subspecialty training. Many fields of training are essentially the same as those available for medicine subspecialty training, although the focus is on the pediatric population.

Licensure
Canadian physicians must undergo an extensive process of licensing in order to practice independently. Upon graduating from medical school, they must pass the Medical Council of Canada Qualifying Examination, Part 1. Following residency training, they pass Part 2 of the Medical Council of Canada Qualifying Examination, in addition to their specialty written examinations and objective structured clinical examinations with the CFPC or RCPSC and any supplementary examinations required by provincial or territorial regulatory authorities.

Graduating family physicians will need to pass their CPFC examinations, while specialist physicians or surgeons will need to pass their RCPSC examinations.

Medical Council of Canada

Founded by the Canada Medical Act in 1912, the Medical Council of Canada (MCC) is an organization charged with the assessment of medical candidates and evaluation of physicians through examinations. It grants a qualification called Licentiate of the Medical Council of Canada (LMCC) to those who wish to practise medicine in Canada.

The MCC administers three different types of examinations:

A pass standing is required on both the QE Part I and the QE Part II in order to be awarded the Licentiate of the Medical Council of Canada designation. LMCC is recognized by the twelve medical licensing authorities in Canada, and is one of the requirements for the issuance of a licence to practise medicine in Canada.

The MCC also maintains the Canadian Medical Register, a list of physicians who have completed or have been exempted from the LMCC requirement. This is the first step for medical graduates who wish to obtain licence to practise prior to applying to their own regulatory body in their home province or territory.

College of Family Physicians of Canada

The CFPC establishes the standards for the training, certification, and lifelong education of family physicians in Canada. It accredits postgraduate family medicine training programs in Canadian medical schools, conducts the certification examination for graduating family medicine residents, and grants the certification (CCFP) and fellowship (FCFP) designations to its members. Although membership is not mandatory to practice medicine, it currently numbers over 38,000 members.

Enhanced skills programs
The CFPC recognizes the following enhanced skills programs for which it delivers a Certificate of Added Competence (CAC) in a specialized domain of family and community medicine:
Emergency medicine (post-nominal designation: CCFP-EM)
Palliative care (post-nominal designation: CCFP-PC)
Care of the elderly (post-nominal designation: CCFP-COE)
Sport and exercise medicine (post-nominal designation: CCFP-SEM)
Anesthesia (post-nominal designation: CCFP-FPA)
Addiction medicine (post-nominal designation: CCFP-AM)
Enhanced surgical skills (post-nominal designation: CCFP-ESS)

Royal College of Physicians and Surgeons of Canada

Provincial or territorial regulatory authority
Once the MCC Qualifying Examination Part 2 and the CFPC or RCPSC examinations are completed, the physician must contact their provincial or territorial regulatory authority in order to obtain their license to practice independently.

For example, in the province of Quebec, the Collège des médecins du Québec is the regulatory authority which emits licenses to physicians and surgeons working within the province. In Ontario, the regulatory college is the College of Physicians and Surgeons of Ontario.

Physician salary 
In Canada, physicians are paid through fee-for-service or alternative payment plans. Average salaries for physicians vary by specialty and province, with surgical specialties earning the most.

Canadian Medical Protective Association

The Canadian Medical Protective Association (CMPA) is a non-profit association committed to provide advice and assistance when medical-legal issues arise in a physician's practice. They provide legal defense, liability protection, and risk-management education for physicians in Canada They also provide monetary compensation to patients and their families proven to have been harmed by negligent clinical care.

Selected Canadian medically relevant publications
 Applied Physiology, Nutrition, and Metabolism
 Biochemistry and Cell Biology
 Canadian Family Physician
 Canadian Journal of Physiology and Pharmacology
 Canadian Journal of Rural Medicine
 Canadian Journal of Surgery
 Canadian Medical Association Journal
 Canadian Medical Education Journal
 Médecin du Québec

Canadian physicians
 Maude Abbott (1896–1940) – Canadian physician, among Canada's earliest female medical graduates, internationally renowned expert on congenital heart disease, and one of the first women to obtain a BA from McGill University
 Evan Adams – First Nations medical doctor, medical advisor, Deputy Provincial Health Advisor (BC), and actor
 Maria Louisa Angwin (1849–1898) – first woman licensed to practice medicine in Nova Scotia
 Elizabeth Bagshaw CM (1881–1982) – physician and birth control activist
 Frederick Banting KBE MC LLD (hc) ScD (hc) FRSC (1891–1941) – Nobel laureate, co-discoverer of insulin
 Norman Bethune (1890–1939) – surgeon, inventor, socialist, battlefield doctor in Spain and China
 Wilfred Gordon Bigelow OC LLD (hc) FRSC (1913–2005) – inventor of the first artificial pacemaker
 Daniel Borsuk OQ (1978– ) – Montreal plastic surgeon, pioneer in facial reconstruction, and leader of first Canadian face transplant
 Basil Boulton (1938–2008) – pediatrician and child health advocate
 John Callaghan OC AOE (1923–2004) – pioneer of open-heart surgery
 Chris Giannou OC (born 1949) war surgeon, chief surgeon ICRC
 Patrick Gullane CM, OOnt Head and Neck Surgery and Oncology pioneer at University Health Network, Toronto, helped established chairs in oncology.
 Carl Goresky OC (1932–1996) – physician and scientist
 James Heilman (born 1979/1980) – head of the department of emergency medicine at East Kootenay Regional Hospital in Cranbrook, British Columbia, active contributor to WikiProject Medicine, and a volunteer Wikipedia administrator
 Ernest McCulloch CM OOnt FRSC FRS (1926–2011) – cellular biologist credited with the discovery of stem cell with James Till
 Frances Gertrude McGill (1882–1959) – pioneering forensic pathologist and criminologist
 Henry Morgentaler CM LLD (hc) (1923–2013) – abortion care provider who helped legalize abortion in Canada and strengthen the power of jury nullification
 William Osler Bt (1849–1919) – physician, called the "father of modern medicine"; wrote Principles and Practice of Medicine
 Wilder Penfield OM CC CMG FRS (1891–1976) – neurosurgeon, discovered electrical stimulation of the brain
 James Rutka OC (born 1956) Canadian pediatric neurosurgeon
 David Sackett  CC FRSC  (born 1934) – founded the first department of clinical epidemiology in Canada at McMaster University
 Sydney Segal  (1920–1997) – pediatrician and neonatologist particularly known for his work with sudden infant death syndrome
 Albert Ross Tilley (1904–1988)  OBE OC – plastic surgeon
Irene Cybulsky
Melanie Morris

See also
College of Family Physicians of Canada
Royal College of Physicians and Surgeons of Canada

References

Canadian physicians
Healthcare in Canada
Medical education in Canada
History of medicine in Canada
Canadian surgeons